Harristown is an unincorporated community in Washington Township, Washington County, in the U.S. state of Indiana.

History
Harristown was laid out in 1850 by Thomas M. Harris, and named for him.

A post office was established at Harristown in 1851, and remained in operation until it was discontinued in 1914.

Geography

References

Unincorporated communities in Washington County, Indiana
1850 establishments in Indiana
Unincorporated communities in Indiana
Populated places established in 1850